Statistics of Guam League in the 1999 season.

Overview
Coors Light Silver Bullets won the championship.

References
RSSSF

Guam Soccer League seasons
Guam
Guam
football